Kuster Mill, also known as Custer's Fulling Mill and Skippack Creek Farm, is a historic fulling mill located in Evansburg State Park on Skippack Creek at Collegeville, Skippack Township, Montgomery County, Pennsylvania.  The complex includes three contributing buildings and one contributing structure.  They are the original mill, mill race, a stone house, and Dutch bank barn.

It was added to the National Register of Historic Places in 1971.

References

External links
Skippack Historical Society: Kuster Mill

Industrial buildings and structures on the National Register of Historic Places in Pennsylvania
Buildings and structures in Montgomery County, Pennsylvania
National Register of Historic Places in Montgomery County, Pennsylvania